The Paul Dumont Trophy is awarded annually to the "Personality of the Year" in the Quebec Major Junior Hockey League. The award can be won by anyone connected to the league, including players and staff. It was named after former league president Paul Dumont.

Winners

External links
 QMJHL official site List of trophy winners.

Quebec Major Junior Hockey League trophies and awards